Ja Htoi Pan is a Kachin youth activist and politician who, representing Kachin Political Interim Coordination Team (KPICT), was appointed by the Committee Representing Pyidaungsu Hluttaw as the deputy minister of education in the National Unity Government on 16 April 2021.

She was born to the Reverend Dr Maran Ja Gun and Lazing Lu Aung in Kachin State.

Ja Htoi Pan studied in London School of Economics and Political Science (LSE) and completed M.A in anthropology from Northern Illinois University. She served as a tutor at Mai Ja Yang-based School of Intensive English Programs (IEP), a director at the Institute of Liberal Arts and Sciences and  an associate director at Kachinland Research Center and published in international peer-reviewed journals.

References

External links

Living people
Burmese politicians
Alumni of the London School of Economics
Northern Illinois University alumni
Year of birth missing (living people)
People from Kachin State
21st-century Burmese women politicians
21st-century Burmese politicians